The 2007 State Farm Home Run Derby was a 2007 Major League Baseball All-Star Game event.  The Home Run Derby was held on July 9 at AT&T Park, the home field of the San Francisco Giants. As usual, the competition had eight competitors, seven of whom were eliminated over three rounds.  The Home Run Derby was seen July 9 on ESPN at 8 p.m. EST. Vladimir Guerrero of the Los Angeles Angels of Anaheim beat Alex Ríos of the Toronto Blue Jays 3–2 in the final.

Competitors

The eight competitors were 2006 winner Ryan Howard of the Philadelphia Phillies, Justin Morneau of the Minnesota Twins, Prince Fielder of the Milwaukee Brewers,  Vladimir Guerrero of the Los Angeles Angels, Magglio Ordóñez of the Detroit Tigers, Albert Pujols of the St. Louis Cardinals (who last participated in  2003), Alex Ríos of the Toronto Blue Jays and Matt Holliday of the Colorado Rockies, who replaced the Florida Marlins' Miguel Cabrera, who was injured in a game on July 7 after being announced as a participant.

Rules
Any ball that is swung at by the batter must be hit over the outfield fence in fair territory to be ruled a home run.  A swing and a miss is an out, but if the batter doesn't swing, no out is recorded.
In the event of a tie, a swing-off will be held. The contestant with the most home runs in five swings advances. If there is still a tie after five swings, each contestant will be given three swings to break the tie.

Round One
Each contestant gets ten outs.  The top four home run hitters advance on to the next round.

Round Two
Totals from the first round carry over.  Each batter again receives ten outs.  The top two advance to the final round.

Round Three
Home run totals do not carry over for this round.  As in the first two rounds, both hitters have ten outs.  The competitor who has the most home runs at the end of the round is the winner.

Competition

italics – Hall of Famer

Recorded only seven of ten outs before hitting winning home run.
Advanced after defeating Morneau 2-1 in a swing-off.

Resources
Derby picks up star power
Guerrero, Ordonez join Derby field
mlb.com's 2007 State Farm Home Run Derby page
Pujols and Rios In

2007
Major League Baseball Home Run Derby, 2007